The George Medal is awarded by the United Kingdom and Commonwealth of Nations for acts of great bravery; over 2,000 medals have been awarded since its inception in September 1940. Below is set out a selection of recipients of the award, in the 1940s. A person's presence in this list does not suggest their award was more notable than any other award of the George Medal.
Where a recipient has received a second George Medal, a picture of the ribbon bearing the bar symbol is shown.

World War II

Other

See also 

 List of recipients of the George Medal for other decades

References

External links
 List of all WW2 Non Combat Gallantry awards

1940s
1940s in the United Kingdom
1940s in the British Empire